Erpužice is a municipality and village in Tachov District in the Plzeň Region of the Czech Republic. It has about 300 inhabitants.

Administrative parts
Villages of Blahousty and Malovice are administrative parts of Erpužice.

Notable people
Karl Ernstberger (1887–1972), German Bohemian architect

Gallery

References

Villages in Tachov District